Carlos Huertas (born 22 June 1991) is a Colombian racing driver.

Racing career
Born in Bogotá, Huertas began his career in Formula BMW UK in 2007 with Räikkönen Robertson Racing where he finished 13th. He finished fifth in the World Final race. In 2008 he returned to Räikkönen Robertson but moved to the FBMW Europe series. He finished ninth in the championship. In 2009 he moved to the British Formula 3 Championship with Räikkönen Robertson and finished seventh in points with two podium finishes. He also finished 12th in the Macau Grand Prix. He returned to British F3 and Räikkönen Robertson in 2010 but dropped to 10th in points, but recorded four podium finishes. In 2011 he remained for a third year in British F3 but switched teams to Carlin Motorsport. Huertas improved to third in the championship points and captured his first series win.

2012 saw Huertas move to Formula Renault 3.5 with Fortec Motorsports. He finished 16th in points with a best finish of fourth in the season opener. Huertas switched teams to Carlin in 2013 and improved to 14th in points and captured his first win at Ciudad del Motor de Aragón. It was announced that he would test an IndyCar Series car for Panther Racing in 2014. He was later announced as a driver with Dale Coyne Racing.

He won his first race in a very eventful 2014 Grand Prix of Houston by running more laps in one stint than anybody else. Four days later the car was found to have an illegally large fuel tank as well as a rear wing infringement. Huertas and the team were each fined $5,000, but the win stood.

He withdrew from the 2015 Indianapolis 500 race due to an inner ear infection and hasn't been seen in Indycar since.

Racing record

Complete Formula Renault 3.5 Series results
(key) (Races in italics indicate fastest lap)

IndyCar Series

Indianapolis 500

References

External links
 
 Career statistics from Driver Database

1991 births
Living people
Colombian racing drivers
Formula BMW UK drivers
Formula BMW Europe drivers
British Formula Three Championship drivers
Sportspeople from Bogotá
Australian Formula 3 Championship drivers
Formula 3 Euro Series drivers
World Series Formula V8 3.5 drivers
IndyCar Series drivers
Colombian IndyCar Series drivers
Indianapolis 500 drivers
Carlin racing drivers
Dale Coyne Racing drivers
Fortec Motorsport drivers
Double R Racing drivers
Hitech Grand Prix drivers
Manor Motorsport drivers
21st-century Colombian people